Du Fu is a crater on Mercury.  Its name was adopted by the International Astronomical Union (IAU) on September 25, 2015. Du Fu is named for the Chinese poet Du Fu.

References

Impact craters on Mercury